Local elections were held in the United Kingdom on 3 May 1990. They were the last local elections held before the resignation of Prime Minister Margaret Thatcher in November 1990.

The main opposition Labour Party gained 284 seats, bringing their number of councillors to 8,920 - their highest since 1981.  Their projected share of the vote was 44%, an increase of 2% from 1989.

The governing Conservative Party lost 222 seats, leaving them with 9,020 councillors.  Their share of the vote was projected to be 33%, a fall of 3% from the previous year. This mounted further pressure on the government of Margaret Thatcher, which had been declining for a year following the introduction of the controversial poll tax, and was a major boost for opposition leader Neil Kinnock, whose Labour Party was enjoying a wide lead in the opinion polls with a general election no more than two years away.

The Liberal Democrats lost 78 seats and had 3,265 councillors after the elections.  Their projected share of the vote was 17%.

Summary of results

England

London boroughs 

In all 32 London boroughs the whole council was up for election.

Metropolitan boroughs
All 36 metropolitan borough councils had one third of their seats up for election.

District councils

Whole council
In 2 districts the whole council was up for election as there were new ward boundaries, following further electoral boundary reviews by the Local Government Boundary Commission for England.

Third of council
In 114 districts one third of the council was up for election.

Scotland

Regional councils

References

Local elections 2006. House of Commons Library Research Paper 06/26.
Vote 1999 BBC News
Vote 2000 BBC News

 
May 1990 events in the United Kingdom